Isaiah 7 is the seventh chapter of the Book of Isaiah in the Hebrew Bible or the Old Testament of the Christian Bible. This book contains the prophecies attributed to the prophet Isaiah and is one of the Books of the Prophets.

Text 
The original text was written in Hebrew language. This chapter is divided into 25 verses.

Textual witnesses
Some early manuscripts containing the text of this chapter in Hebrew are of the Masoretic Text tradition, which includes the Codex Cairensis (895), the Petersburg Codex of the Prophets (916), Aleppo Codex (10th century), Codex Leningradensis (1008).

Fragments containing parts of this chapter were found among the Dead Sea Scrolls (3rd century BC or later):
1QIsaa: complete
1QIsab: extant: verses 14‑16, 20‑25
4QIsaf (4Q60): extant: verses 16‑18, 23‑25
4QIsah (4Q62): extant: verses 14‑15
4QIsal (4Q65): extant: verses 17‑20

There is also a translation into Koine Greek known as the Septuagint, made in the last few centuries BCE. Extant ancient manuscripts of the Septuagint version include Codex Vaticanus (B; B; 4th century), Codex Sinaiticus (S; BHK: S; 4th century), Codex Alexandrinus (A; A; 5th century) and Codex Marchalianus (Q; Q; 6th century).

Parashot
The parashah sections listed here are based on the Aleppo Codex. Isaiah 7 is a part of the Prophecies about Judah and Israel (Isaiah 1-12). {P}: open parashah; {S}: closed parashah.
 {P} 7:1-2 {S} 7:3-6 {P} 7:7-9 {P} 7:10-17 {P} 7:18-20 {P} 7:21-22 {S} 7:23-25 {P}

Verse 1
Now it came to pass in the days of Ahaz the son of Jotham, the son of Uzziah, king of Judah, that Rezin, king of Syria and Pekah the son of Remaliah, king of Israel, went up to Jerusalem to make war against it, but could not prevail against it.
Cross reference: ; Matthew 1:9

The purpose of the war was to bring Judah into an anti-Assyrian coalition.

Verse 3
'Then the Lord said to Isaiah, 
 “Go out now to meet Ahaz, you and Shear-Jashub your son,
 at the end of the aqueduct from the upper pool, on the highway to the Fuller’s Field,
 "Shear-Jashub": literally means "A remnant will return" (compare Isaiah 7:14; Isaiah 8:3) serves "as a good omen for Ahaz."
According to the New Oxford Annotated Bible, the "upper pool" is the "reservoir south of Gihon Spring". This was unlikely to be a regular meeting point: the Good News Translation calls the area "the road where the cloth makers work"; Ahaz may have gone there to undertake an engineering inspection, to ensure either that the water supplies for Jerusalem were secure, or that they would not be accessible to invading forces.

Isaiah speaks God's word to Ahaz; apparently this is "received in silence, at any rate without acknowledgment".

The place of meeting would witness another confrontation between Rabshakeh, the messenger of Sennacherib, king of Assyria, with the officials of Hezekiah, son of Ahaz (Isaiah 36:2), presenting a contrast of behavior between Ahaz and Hezekiah.

Verse 12
Ahaz said, “I will not ask [for a sign], nor will I test the Lord!”

Verse 14

 Therefore the Lord himself shall give you a sign; Behold, a virgin shall conceive, and bear a son, and shall call his name Immanuel.

The Hebrew Masoretic text (10th century) and the Isaiah scroll (2nd century BC): (read from right to left)

Transliteration
 "lā·ḵên yitên ’ă·ḏō·nāy hū lā·ḵem o·wt: hinneh hā·‘al·māh hā·rāh wə·yō·le·ḏeṯ bên, wə·qā·rāṯ shem-o imanuel"

This verse is cited in Matthew 1:23.

Verse 15
Butter and honey shall he eat, that he may know to refuse the evil, and choose the good.
"Butter" (chem'âh): could be rendered as "thick and curdled milk".

Verse 18
And it shall come to pass in that day, that the Lord shall hiss for the fly that is in the uttermost part of the rivers of Egypt, and for the bee that is in the land of Assyria.
The Pulpit Commentary suggests that "the choice of the terms 'bee' and 'fly' to represent respectively the hosts of Assyria and Egypt, is not without significance. Egyptian armies were swarms, hastily levied, and very imperfectly disciplined. Assyrian were bodies of trained troops accustomed to war, and almost as well disciplined as the Romans."

Uses

Music
The King James Version of verse 14 from this chapter is cited as texts in the English-language oratorio "Messiah" by George Frideric Handel (HWV 56).

See also

Related Bible parts: 2 Kings 16, 2 Kings 18, Isaiah 36, Matthew 1, John 5

References

Sources

External links

Jewish
Isaiah 7: Hebrew with Parallel English

Christian
Isaiah 7 English Translation with Parallel Latin Vulgate

07
House of Pekah